In enzymology, a methylmalonyl-CoA carboxytransferase is an enzyme that catalyzes the chemical reaction

(S)-methylmalonyl-CoA + pyruvate  propanoyl-CoA + oxaloacetate

Thus, the two substrates of this enzyme are (S)-methylmalonyl-CoA and pyruvate, whereas its two products are propanoyl-CoA and oxaloacetate.

This enzyme belongs to the family of transferases that transfer one-carbon groups, specifically the carboxy- and carbamoyltransferases. The systematic name of this enzyme class is (S)-methylmalonyl-CoA:pyruvate carboxytransferase. Other names in common use include transcarboxylase, methylmalonyl coenzyme A carboxyltransferase, methylmalonyl-CoA transcarboxylase, oxalacetic transcarboxylase, methylmalonyl-CoA carboxyltransferase, methylmalonyl-CoA carboxyltransferase, (S)-2-methyl-3-oxopropanoyl-CoA:pyruvate carboxyltransferase, (S)-2-methyl-3-oxopropanoyl-CoA:pyruvate carboxytransferase, and carboxytransferase [incorrect]. This enzyme participates in propanoate metabolism. It has 3 cofactors: zinc, Biotin,  and Cobalt.

Structural studies

References

 
 

EC 2.1.3
Zinc enzymes
Biotin enzymes
Cobalt enzymes
Enzymes of known structure